The house at 536 Park Street is a Bungalow/Craftsman style house located in Kingman, Arizona. The house is listed on the National Register of Historic Places.  It was evaluated for National Register listing as part of a 1985 study of 63 historic resources in Kingman that led to this and many others being listed.

Description 
The house at 536 Park Street in Kingman, Arizona was built around 1906 in the Bungalow/Craftsman style as another south side home for the workers. The house was added to the National Register of Historic Places in 1986.

References

Houses completed in 1906
Houses in Kingman, Arizona
Houses on the National Register of Historic Places in Arizona
National Register of Historic Places in Kingman, Arizona
1906 establishments in Arizona Territory